General Beck may refer to:

A. J. Beck (1914–2006), U.S. Air Force major general
Edward Beck (British Army officer) (1880–1974), British Army major general
Ludwig Beck (1880–1944), German Army general 
Stanley C. Beck (born 1929), U.S. Air Force major general

See also
John Becke (1879–1949), Royal Air Force brigadier general
Friedrich von Beck-Rzikowsky (1830–1920), Austrian Imperial Army colonel general